Robert Daniel Menaker (September 17, 1941 – October 26, 2020) was an American fiction writer and editor. He worked with the MFA program at Stony Brook Southampton and as a consultant for Barnes & Noble Bookstores.

Personal life
Menaker was born in Manhattan to Robert Menaker — son of a Russian Jewish immigrant — and Mary R. Grace, who was the chief copy editor at Fortune magazine. He attended Little Red School House in Greenwich Village and Nyack High School in Rockland County, New York, studied philosophy and poetry at Swarthmore College in Pennsylvania, and obtained a master's degree in English from Johns Hopkins University. Menaker's father was a communist who was additionally alleged to be a Soviet intelligence agent, and Menaker described himself as an anarcho-syndicalist.

Menaker married Katherine Bouton in 1980. They had two children: a daughter, Elizabeth, and a son, Will, who is a co-host of the podcast Chapo Trap House.

Menaker died from pancreatic cancer on October 26, 2020, at his home in New Marlborough, Massachusetts.

Career 
Menaker was a fiction editor at The New Yorker for twenty years and had material published in the magazine frequently. In 1995 he was hired by Harold Evans as Senior Literary Editor at Random House and later became Executive Editor-in-Chief, working with such writers as Salman Rushdie, Colum McCann, Elizabeth Strout, and Nassim Taleb. After leaving Random House in 2007, he became the host for a web-based book show called "Titlepage" in 2008.

Awards 
PEN/O. Henry Award for Short Fiction: "The Good Left" 1984
PEN/O. Henry Award for Short Fiction: "The Good Left" 1982 
New York Times Notable Book: "The Treatment" 1998

Publications 
"The African Svelte: Ingenious Misspellings that Make Surprising Sense" - 2016
"The Committee: The Story of the 1976 Union Drive at the New Yorker Magazine" - (article, audiobook) 2015
"My Mistake: A Memoir" - 2013
"A Good Talk: The Story and Skill of Conversation" - 2011
"The Treatment" - 1998
"The Old Left and Other Stories" - 1987
"The Worst" (with Charles McGrath) - 1979
"Friends and Relations: A Collection of Stories" - 1976

References

External links 
 

1941 births
2020 deaths
20th-century American male writers
20th-century American non-fiction writers
21st-century American male writers
21st-century American non-fiction writers
American editors
American male journalists
American people of Russian-Jewish descent
American short story writers
Anarcho-syndicalists
Deaths from cancer in Massachusetts
Deaths from pancreatic cancer
Johns Hopkins University alumni
Journalists from New York City
Little Red School House alumni
Nyack High School alumni
People from Manhattan
Swarthmore College alumni
The New Yorker people
Writers from Manhattan